Intef (also Antef, Inyotef and Anyotef) was a common ancient Egyptian name, normally transliterated as jnj-jt(=f) and translated: His father brought him.

Pharaohs

11th dynasty

 Intef the Elder, Theban Nomarch later considered the founding ancestor of the 11th Dynasty.
 Sehertawy Intef I, first ruler of the dynasty to claim an Horus name.
 Wahankh Intef II, 2112–2063 BC
 Nakhtnebtepnefer Intef III, a son of Intef II and father of Mentuhotep II

In Nubia
 Qakare Ini (Intef), possibly only in Nubia

13th dynasty

 Ameny Antef Amenenhat, sometimes referred to as Intef IV, more generally as Amenemhat VI.
 Sehetepkare Intef, referred to as Intef IV or Intef V depending on the scholar

17th dynasty

 Sekhemre-Wepmaat Intef, referred to as Intef V or Intef VI.
 Nubkheperre Intef, referred to as Intef VI or Intef VII.
 Sekhemre-Heruhirmaat Intef, referred to as Intef VII or Intef VIII.

Court officials 
 Intef (general) (11th dynasty)